Étude Op. 25, No. 6, in G-sharp minor, is a technical study composed by Frédéric Chopin focusing on thirds, trilling them at a high speed. Also called the Double Thirds Étude, it is considered one of the hardest of Chopin's 24 Études, ranking the highest level of difficulty according to the Henle difficulty rankings.

Excerpt from the beginning of the Étude Op. 25 No. 6

Technical difficulties
The most conspicuous difficulty is the trilling of thirds quickly, such as in the beginning of the piece. However, there are also other difficulties, such as playing a chromatic scale in thirds with one hand (m. 5), and alternating chords with fingerings 3–5 and 1–2 (m. 27). At one point (m. 31), both hands do this together in descending diminished seventh chords.

References

External links 
 
 Op. 25, No. 6 played by Josef Lhévinne
 Op. 25, No. 6 played by Alfred Cortot
 Op. 25, No. 6 played by Claudio Arrau
 Op. 25, No. 6 played by Sviatoslav Richter
 Op. 25, No. 6 played by Adam Harasiewicz 
 Op. 25, No. 6 played by Vladimir Ashkenazy
 Op. 25, No. 6 played by Maurizio Pollini

25 06
1837 compositions
Compositions in G-sharp minor